This list of mines in Kosovo is subsidiary to the list of mines article and lists working, defunct and future mines in the country and is organised by the primary mineral output. For practical purposes stone, marble and other quarries may be included in this list.

Bauxite

Coal
Sibovc Coal Mine
Bardh i Madh coal mine
Mirash open-cast coal mine

Gold
Trpeza mine

Lead & Zinc
Belo Brdo mine
Crepulje mine
Crnac mine
Drazhnje mine
Hajvalia mine
Novo Brdo mine
Stari Trg mine

Magnesium
Goleš mine
Strezovc mine

Nickel
Dushkaja mine
Gllavica mine
Suke mine

References

 
Kos